Weighell is a surname. Notable people with the surname include:

 James Weighell (born 1994), English cricketer
 Ron Weighell (1950–2020), British fiction writer
 Sidney Weighell (1922–2002), British trade unionist and union secretary
 William Weighell (1846–1905), English cricketer